The 2010 Indy Japan 300 was the 16th round of the 2010 IndyCar Series season and the eighth running of the event . It took place on Sunday September 19, 2010. The race was contested over 200 laps at the  Twin Ring Motegi in Motegi, Tochigi, Japan. This was the last race to be contested by Indy Cars at the Twin Ring Motegi oval circuit as they switched to the road course for the last race in 2011.

Classification

Qualifying

Race

References

Indy Japan 300
Indy Japan 300
Indy Japan 300
Indy Japan 300